The 2017–18 Stanford Cardinal men's basketball team represented Stanford University during the 2017–18 NCAA Division I men's basketball season. The Cardinal, led by second-year head coach Jerod Haase, played their home games at Maples Pavilion as members of the Pac-12 Conference. They finished the season 19–16, 11–7 in Pac-12 play, finishing in a three-way tie for third place. As the No. 5 seed in the Pac-12 tournament, they defeated California in the first round before losing to UCLA in the quarterfinals. They received an invitation to the National Invitation Tournament where they defeated BYU in the first round before losing to Oklahoma State in the second round.

Previous season 
The Cardinal finished the 2016–17 season 14–17, 6–12 in Pac-12 play to finish in ninth place. They lost in the first round of the Pac-12 tournament to Arizona State.

Offseason

Departures

2017 recruiting class

2018 recruiting class

Roster

Schedule and results

|-
!colspan=12 style=| Exhibition

|-
!colspan=12 style=| Non-conference regular season

|-
!colspan=12 style=| Pac-12 Regular season

|-
!colspan=12 style=| Pac-12 Tournament

|-
!colspan=12 style=| NIT

Source:

References

Stanford Cardinal men's basketball seasons
Stanford
Stanford
Stanford
Stanford